Obenshain is a surname. Notable people with the surname include:

Kate Obenshain (born 1968), American journalist and politician, sister of Mark and daughter of Richard
Mark Obenshain (born 1962),  American politician and attorney
Richard D. Obenshain (1935–1978), American politician and attorney